"Night" is a popular song recorded by Jackie Wilson in 1960. The single was Wilson's biggest hit, peaking at #4 on the Billboard Hot 100.

Background
The song is based on the aria "Mon cœur s'ouvre à ta voix" from the opera Samson and Delilah by Camille Saint-Saëns, with lyrics by Johnny Lehmann. This was a successful effort for Jackie Wilson to sing in an operatic voice. This version ended on a wild orchestral descending scale in the strings.

Chart performance

References 

Songs about nights
1960 songs
Jackie Wilson songs